Gallium indium arsenide antimonide phosphide ( or GaInPAsSb) is a semiconductor material.

Research has shown that GaInAsSbP can be used in the manufacture of mid-infrared light-emitting diodes and thermophotovoltaic cells.

GaInAsSbP layers can be grown by heteroepitaxy on indium arsenide, gallium antimonide and other materials. The exact composition can be tuned in order to make it lattice matched. The presence of five elements in the alloy allows extra degrees of freedom, making it possible to fix the lattice constant while varying the bandgap. E.g. Ga0.92In0.08P0.05As0.08Sb0.87 is lattice matched to InAs.

See also
 Aluminium gallium phosphide
 Aluminium gallium indium phosphide
 Indium gallium arsenide phosphide
 Indium arsenide antimonide phosphide
 Indium gallium arsenide antimonide

References

III-V semiconductors
Gallium compounds
Indium compounds
Arsenides
Antimonides
Phosphides
III-V compounds